Max Busnelli (born 14 December 1975) is a racing car driver from Italy. He drove two races for the Italian A1 Team.

Complete A1 Grand Prix results
(Races in bold indicate pole position) (Races in italics indicate fastest lap) (sr = sprint race, fr = feature race)

References

1975 births
Living people
Italian racing drivers
A1 Team Italy drivers
Auto GP drivers
International GT Open drivers

Le Mans Cup drivers
GT4 European Series drivers